Club Deportivo Castellón, S.A.D. is a professional Spanish football team based in Castellón de la Plana, in the Valencian Community. Founded on 20 July 1922, it currently plays in Primera División RFEF – Group 2, holding home games at Nou Estadi Castàlia, which has a capacity of 15,500 seats.

History
Football first appeared in the town in 1911, and after a period of time under the consecutive denominations "Deportivo", "Castalia", "Gimnástico", "Cultural" and "Cervantes", Club Deportivo Castellón was founded on 22 July 1922.

The club featured periodically in the top flight, finishing fifth in 1972–73 and adding a Cup final appearance with a team featuring Vicente del Bosque, who later moved to Real Madrid, serving the club as both a player and coach.

On 29 August 1991, in an extraordinary assembly, the conversion of the club to S.A.D. was approved. The first team had just relegated into division two, and would drop another level to the third three years later, in a spell which would last more than one decade.

In the 2004–05 season, Castellón finished fourth in Segunda B, eventually winning its promotion playoffs (both matches) and achieving a return to the silver category. The club's stint in the division would last five years, as relegation would befall in 2009–10, with the Valencian Community outfit ranking last, 13 points behind the following team.

On 18 July 2011, due to the team not paying its players, Castellón was excluded from the third division, being relegated to the fourth. In June 2017, former player Pablo Hernández became joint owner of the club, leading a consortium alongside Angel Dealbert, businessman Vicente Montesinos and others.

On 21 March 2018, Castellón beat the record of seasonal tickets in the fourth division previously held by Real Oviedo with 12,700, establishing the new record at 12,867. On 24 June 2018, it returned to the third tier after a seven-year absence.

On 26 July 2020, Castellón promoted back to second division after 10 years by beating Cornellà in final play off promotion, but they were immediately relegated in the 2020–21 season.

Season to season

11 seasons in La Liga
41 seasons in Segunda División
2 seasons in Primera División RFEF
14 seasons in Segunda División B
21 seasons in Tercera División

Current squad
.

Reserve team

Out on loan

Honours
Segunda División: 1940–41, 1980–81, 1988–89
Segunda División B: 2002–03
Tercera División: 1929–30, 1952–53, 1963–64, 1964–65, 1965–66, 1968–69 (third level until 1976–77)
Campeonato de Valencia: 1928–29, 1929–30
Copa de la Liga (second division): 1983–84
Copa del Rey: Runner-up 1972–73

Notable players

 Leonardo Ulloa
 Mario Cabrera
 Dani Pendín
 Gustavo Reggi
 Ihar Hurynovich
 Bernard Barnjak
 Mauricio Romero
 Mladen Mladenović
 Sergio Barila
 Juan Epitié
 Juvenal
 Emilio Nsue
 José Luis Rondo
 Henri Dumat
 Kenji Fukuda
 Nduka Ugbade
    Igor Dobrovolski
 Dragan Punišić
 Rade Tošić
 Pichi Alonso
 José Araquistáin
 Pascual Babiloni
 Luis Cela
 Ángel Dealbert
  Božur Matejić
 Vicente del Bosque
 José Ferrer
 Miguel Ángel Lotina
 César Martín
 Gaizka Mendieta
 Miguel Ángel
 Juan Planelles
 Roberto
 Antonio Ruiz
 Enrique Saura
 Rubén Torrecilla
 Pablo Hernández
 Walter Peletti
  Đorđe Vujkov
 Florin Andone

References

External links
 
Futbolme team profile 
Pam Pam Orellut, unofficial website 

 
Football clubs in the Valencian Community
Association football clubs established in 1922
Sport in Castellón de la Plana
1922 establishments in Spain
Segunda División clubs
La Liga clubs
Primera Federación clubs